Marino Vigna (born 6 November 1938) is a retired Italian cyclist who won a gold medal in the team pursuit at the 1960 Summer Olympics.

After the Olympics he became a professional road racer and won one stage of the Giro d'Italia in 1963; the Tre Valli Varesine and one stage of the Tour de Romandie in 1964; the Trofeo Laigueglia in 1965, and the Milano–Torino in 1966.

He later became a sports director for cycling teams, directing the Faema team in the 1969 Giro d'Italia when their star Eddy Merckx was expelled for a doping violation.

See also
Italy national cycling team – Olympic Games

References

1938 births
Living people
Cyclists at the 1960 Summer Olympics
Olympic cyclists of Italy
Olympic gold medalists for Italy
Italian male cyclists
Olympic medalists in cycling
Cyclists from Milan
Medalists at the 1960 Summer Olympics
Italian track cyclists